The botanical term “spur” is given to outgrowths of tissue on different plant organs.  The most common usage of the term in botany refers to nectar spurs in flowers.

 nectar spur
 spur (stem)
 spur (leaf)

See also 
Fascicle
Sepal
Petal
Tepal
Calyx
Corolla

Plant anatomy
Plant morphology